Cosheston is a village, parish and community in Pembrokeshire, Wales.  It is situated on an inlet of the Daugleddau estuary, 3 km north-east of Pembroke. The parish includes the settlement of Bateman's Hill. The northern part of the community is in the Pembrokeshire Coast National Park.  Together with Upton and Nash, it constitutes the community of Cosheston, which had a population of 713 in 2001, increasing to 828 at the 2011 Census.

Name
The placename means "Constantine's farm".

Parish
The parish had an area of 813 Ha. Its census populations were: 401 (1801): 551 (1851): 556 (1901): 381 (1951): 593 (1981): 828 (2011).

The parish church is dedicated to St Michael and had a spire in the 19th century.

The percentage of Welsh speakers was 4.9 (1891): 4.3 (1931): 2.6 (1971): 10.7 (2011).

Governance
Cosheston, together with Lamphey, forms an electoral ward. The total ward population taken at the 2011 Census was 1,671.

References

External links 
Historical information and links on GENUKI
Photos of Cosheston and surrounding area on geograph.org.uk

Villages in Pembrokeshire
Communities in Pembrokeshire